Down Home Sessions III is the third EP from American country music artist Cole Swindell. The album includes five tracks, all co-written by Swindell.

Swindell promoted the album via a Down Home Tour. Fans who pre-ordered the album received two bonus tracks: "You've Got My Number" and "Chevrolet DJ".

Commercial performance
Down Home Sessions III debuted at number 36 on the US Billboard 200 and number five on the US Top Country Albums, selling 11,000 copies in the first week.

Track listing

Personnel
 Pat Buchanan – electric guitar
 Michael Carter – acoustic guitar, electric guitar, keyboards
 Dave Cohen – keyboards
 James Mitchell – electric guitar
 Greg Morrow – drums, percussion
 Billy Panda – acoustic guitar
 Cole Swindell – lead vocals
 Russell Terrell – background vocals
 Mike Wolofsky – bass guitar

Charts

References

External links 
 

2016 EPs
Cole Swindell EPs
Warner Records EPs